Visa requirements for Uzbekistan citizens are administrative entry restrictions by the authorities of other states placed on citizens of Uzbekistan. The article is concerning ordinary passport holders and tourists. As of 5 January 2021, 25 visa-free countries and 33 visa-on-arrival countries, as a result, ranking the Uzbekistan passport 91st in terms of travel freedom according to the Henley Passport Index.

Exit visas
All Uzbek citizens were required to obtain an exit visa to travel to all non-CIS countries from 1995 until 2019. An exit visa was not needed for trips to CIS countries as long as the travelers did not then go to a non-CIS country. Penalties for traveling to non-CIS countries without an exit visa included heavy fines and prison terms up to 10 years in length. Exit visas were obtained from the Interior Ministry's local OVIR (Office of Visas and Registration) department, and were valid for two years.

Uzbek immigration authorities did not allow Uzbek citizens to board outbound flights without a valid visa for the destination country and/or a return ticket even if the destination country grants visa on arrival to Uzbek passport holders. As a result, Uzbek citizens had to go to the immigration counter at Tashkent International Airport for an approval and a stamp on their tickets before they proceeded to a check-in counter.

The exit visa requirement was abolished on 1 January 2019 after a presidential decree signed in August 2017 came into force.

Visa requirements map

Visa requirements

See also 

 Visa policy of Uzbekistan
 Uzbekistan passport

References and notes
References

Notes

Uzbekistan
Foreign relations of Uzbekistan